Chauvac-Laux-Montaux is a commune in the Drôme department in southeastern France.

The commune comprises two villages, Chauvac and Le Laux, situated at the foot of the Col de Reychasset. The villages are situated 33 kilometres to the southwest of Serres and 50 kilometres to the east of Nyons.

Population

See also
Communes of the Drôme department

References

Communes of Drôme